The 2011 USA Outdoor Track and Field Championships were held at Hayward Field in Eugene, Oregon. Organised by USA Track and Field, the four-day competition took place from June 23–26 and served as the national championships in track and field for the United States. The results determined qualification for the American team at the 2011 World Championships in Athletics, to be held in Daegu.

The competition was broadcast on television by three networks: ESPN2, Universal Sports and NBC.

Medal summary

Men track events

Men field events

Women track events

Women field events

References

Results
2011 USA Outdoor Championships June 23. Flash Results. Retrieved on 2011-11-13.
Day reports
Lee, Kirby (2011-06-24). Carter prevails in epic women’s Shot Put battle in Eugene – USA champs, Day 1. IAAF. Retrieved on 2011-06-24.

External links
Official webpage at USATF

USA Outdoor Track and Field Championships
USA Outdoors
Track, Outdoor
2011 in sports in Oregon
Track and field in Oregon